Black Flag or black flag may refer to:

Flags

 The Black Standard, a legendary flag in Islamic tradition
 The Anarchist black flag
 The Jolly Roger, flag associated with piracy
 The Pan-African flag, a trans-national unity symbol
 Black flag (racing)

Arts, entertainment, and media
 Black Flag (band), an American hardcore punk band
 Black Flag (Ektomorf album), a 2012 album by Ektomorf
 Black Flag (Machine Gun Kelly mixtape), 2013
 "Black Flag" (song), a 1992 song by King's X
 Black Flag (newspaper), a publication in Britain
 Assassin's Creed IV: Black Flag, 2013 videogame by Ubisoft
 Black Flags: The Rise of ISIS, a 2015 Pulitzer prize-winning book by Joby Warrick

Places
 Black Flag, Western Australia, an abandoned town named after the Black Flag gold mine and farm

Other uses
 Ali Charaf Damache, a terror suspect with the nom de guerre "the Black Flag"
 Black Flag (insecticide)
 Black Flag Army, a militia in Vietnam and southern China, 1860s-1885
 Chernoe Znamia, a 20th-century Russian anarchist organisation
 Ferraria crispa, a plant also known as black flag